The Basketball at the 1985 Southeast Asian Games was held at the Gymnasium in the Bangkok Youth Centre, Bangkok, Thailand between December 9 to December 16.

Medals by event

References
BASOC (1985) 13th SEA Games Official Report, Thailand

1985
1985 in Asian basketball
International basketball competitions hosted by Thailand